Helsinki University of Technology (TKK;) was a technical university in Finland. It was located in Otaniemi, Espoo in the metropolitan area of Greater Helsinki. The university was founded in 1849 by Grand Duke of Finland, Emperor Nicholas I and received university status in 1908. It moved from Helsinki to Otaniemi campus area in 1966. The merger of HUT with two smaller schools created Aalto University in 2010, and HUT briefly held the name Aalto University School of Science and Technology before being split into four schools in 2011.

Much of the university's Otaniemi campus was designed by Alvar Aalto.

History

In 1849, TKK was established in Helsinki by the decree of the Russian Emperor Nicholas I, Grand Duke of Finland as a "manufacture and handicraft school", with the name Helsingin teknillinen reaalikoulu/Helsingfors tekniska realskola, along with two other similar schools, situated in Vaasa and Turku. The school started its function in the Domus Litonii ("Litonius house") building located at Aleksanterinkatu 50, which had been designed by Gustaf Paulus Leander and completed in 1847, and remains in use and in ownership by the Litonius family to this day.

In 1872, the school's name was changed to Polyteknillinen koulu/Polytekniska skolan ("Polytechnical School") and in 1878, to Polyteknillinen opisto/Polytekniska institutet ("Polytechnical Institute"), while the two other manufacture and handiwork schools were demoted to institutions of lower level. In 1877 the school moved to larger premises to a new building near the Hietalahdentori market square. As the proportion of matriculation diploma holders in the student intake gradually increased, the school gained more social respectability. In 1908, TKK was given university status along with its present name, thus becoming the second university to be founded in Finland. In 1955, building of the new campus area started with the housing village. In 1966, TKK moved from Helsinki to the new campus in Otaniemi, Espoo.

In the past, the university was also known by the abbreviations HUT and TH, from its English language and Swedish language names, but in 2005 a decision was made to officially solely use the abbreviation TKK for branding reasons.

In 2010, TKK was merged with Helsinki School of Economics and University of Art and Design Helsinki into Aalto University. After brief existence in the new university as own institution, Aalto University School of Science and Technology, it was split into four schools, corresponding to four old faculties, School of Engineering, School of Science, School of Electrical Engineering, and Aalto University School of Chemical Technology. In 2012, the Department of Architecture of the School of Engineering, formerly of Faculty of Engineering and Architecture, was merged with Aalto University School of Art and Design into Aalto University School of Arts, Design and Architecture.

Research and teaching

Studies
All engineering programmes offered by TKK led to the degree of diplomi-insinööri ("engineer with university diploma"), a five-year master's degree. The only exceptions to this were the architecture programmes that lead to the master's degrees of architecture and landscape architecture. From 2005, according to the Bologna process, all students might also complete an intermediate degree (tekniikan kandidaatti, TkK) before the DI or architect's degree. This degree is considered a bachelor's degree and enables enrollment in foreign universities where a bachelor's degree is required. TKK did not offer programs terminating in a bachelor's degree; a student might only be accepted to study for the Master's level degree. TKK required a bachelor's degree from foreign students studying in English, because only Master's studies were offered completely in English.

Apart from numerous programs in Finnish language, various international Master's programs were offered exclusively for studies in English.

Faculties and research
The university was organized in four faculties, each consisting of departments and separate laboratories, and separate units not operating under any faculty.

Faculty of Chemistry and Materials Sciences, currently Aalto University School of Chemical Technology (Aalto CHEM)
Department of Biotechnology and Chemical Technology
Department of Chemistry
Department of Materials Science and Engineering
Department of Forest Products Technology
Faculty of Electronics, Communications and Automation, currently Aalto University School of Electrical Engineering (Aalto ELEC)
Department of Automation and Systems Technology
Department of Electronics
Department of Micro and Nanosciences
Department of Radio Science and Engineering
Department of Signal Processing and Acoustics
Department of Electrical Engineering
Department of Communications and Networking
Metsähovi Radio Observatory
Faculty of Engineering and Architecture, currently split between Aalto University School of Engineering (Aalto ENG) and Aalto University School of Arts, Design and Architecture (Aalto ARTS)
Department of Architecture
Department of Energy Technology
Department of Engineering Design and Production
Department of Surveying
Department of Structural Engineering and Building Technology
Department of Applied Mechanics
Department of Civil and Environmental Engineering
TKK Lahti Center
Centre for Urban and Regional Studies YTK
Faculty of Information and Natural Sciences, currently Aalto University School of Science (Aalto SCI)
Department of Biomedical Engineering and Computational Science
Department of Mathematics and Systems Analysis
Department of Media Technology
Department of Applied Physics
Department of Information and Computer Science
Department of Computer Science and Engineering
Department of Industrial Engineering and Management
BIT Research Centre
Language Centre
TKK Main Library
Lifelong Learning Institute Dipoli
Low Temperature Laboratory

Additionally, TKK participated in various joint units with other Finnish universities and the VTT Technical Research Centre of Finland:

Helsinki Institute of Physics (with University of Helsinki)
Helsinki Institute for Information Technology (with University of Helsinki)
Micronova Center of Micro and Nanotechnology (with VTT Technical Research Centre of Finland)

TKK participated in 12 Centres of Excellence (huippuyksikkö), selected by the Academy of Finland to represent the top research in the country and receiving separate, fixed-period funding from the Academy.

Researchers at TKK have achieved notability in, among other things, low temperature physics (holding the current world record for the lowest temperature achieved), the development of devices and methods for magnetoencephalography, mobile communications, wood processing, and neural networks, with professor Teuvo Kohonen initiating research in self-organizing maps. Additionally, the first commercialised total synthesis, the synthesis of camphor, was invented by Gustaf Komppa, the first professor of chemistry at TKK  and the Nobel laureate (chemistry, 1945) Artturi Virtanen held a professorship in biochemistry at TKK. More recently, the university has notably invested in the research of nanotechnology, operating the largest cleanroom facility in Northern Europe and of the largest microscopy clusters in Europe.

The Nokia Research Center has operated a "lablet" on university premises since 2008, in order to establish joint research programs and daily interaction between Nokia and university researchers, who would share the same facilities.

Campus
TKK was located in Otaniemi, Espoo. Several high-tech companies, the Finnish forest industry's joint experimental laboratory KCL, and business incubators Innopoli and Technopolis are also situated there. It is also directly adjacent to Keilaniemi, with Life Science Center and the headquarters of several notable Finnish companies, such as Nokia and Fortum. The area is connected by a 15-minute bus ride to the center of Helsinki.

Culture and student life

TKK was known for its active student community and technology students (teekkaris) are highly noticeable, as they wear a distinctive hat and often brightly colored overalls to many of their public events. The community has also organised important charity events (tempaus in local language). TKK students are also famous for, and Finland's leading practitioners of, student pranks (jäynä), similar in principle to MIT hacks. Their most widely publicised stunt took place in 1961, when a team of students smuggled a statue of Paavo Nurmi onto the 300-year-old wreck of Regalskeppet Vasa just days before its lifting from the bottom of the sea.

Student Union
The Student Union of Helsinki University of Technology (TKY) was the interest group for the students of the university. In 2006 it had 11,187 members, which included all the students of the university, as is stipulated by Finnish law. It was founded in 1872.

Student Nation
TKK was also one of the two universities in Finland to host one or more nations, a Finnish type of student corporation. The only nation at TKK was Teknologföreningen (TF) and its goal was to unite Swedish-speaking students at TKK. Teknologföreningen was founded in 1872, prior to the student union. Teknologföreningen also has its own building opposite to Dipoli called Urdsgjallar, completed in 1966. The Finnish-speaking student nation Tekniikan Ylioppilaat was disbanded in 1972 and its functions given to the university student union, since a separate Finnish-speaking nation in a university with an overwhelming Finnish-speaking majority was considered unnecessary. The regional Finnish-speaking nations at the University of Helsinki also accepted TKK students as members.

Student housing
The housing area of Otaniemi campus, known as Teekkarikylä (technology student village), was owned mostly by the student union and partly by HOAS (Helsinki Student Housing Fund). The housing was characterised by the presence of foreign students of many nationalities. As of 2005, the village offered housing for approximately 2,600 students.

Construction of the Otaniemi campus was started in 1950, in order for the first buildings to host the athletes of the 1952 Summer Olympics in Helsinki. Some of the building material originally used for the campus was acquired from the former Soviet Union embassy, which had been destroyed during World War II, as a result of bombings by Soviet Union itself. Later the student housing has been used for housing athletes again in a number of athletics events, sometimes to the dismay of the students that have to move out during the events. The quality of the Otaniemi student housing holds a high standard in international comparison.

The campus contains the former student union building and convention centre Dipoli, named as the second Poli, the second building of the polytechnic students. The original first building being located formerly in the Helsinki centre. Dipoli was designed by Reima and Raili Pietilä and was completed in 1966. However, in 1993 the building was transformed into a training centre of the university. The ownership of the property was later transferred from the student union to the university itself, due to high maintenance costs. It is regularly used for conventions, congresses and student parties.

Associations

In addition to the student union TKK students have formed numerous associations for studies, cultural activity and sports. In 2007, there were some 150 associations maintained by university students. In 2006, two-thirds of the student union members were members of "the guilds", which are student associations uniting students inside their department, e.g. the Guild of Electrical Engineers.

List of student associations of Helsinki University of Technology

Currently this list includes only the associations known to have English Wikipedia articles.

The Polytech Choir
Polyteknikkojen Ilmailukerho (Flying club)

Notable people and alumni 

 Veikko Aleksanteri Heiskanen (23 July 1895, in Kangaslampi – 23 October 1971, in Helsinki) Finnish geodesist. In 1931–1949, Heiskanen was Professor of Geodesy, Helsinki University of Technology.
 Reino Antero Hirvonen (1908–1989) Finnish physical geodesist, also well known for contributions in mathematical and astronomical geodesy.
 Hjalmar Mellin, professor of mathematics, rector (1904–1907)
 Gunnar Nordström, professor of physics
 Gustaf Komppa, professor of chemistry
 Artturi Virtanen, professor of biochemistry, Nobel laureate (Chemistry, 1945)
 Olli Lounasmaa, professor of physics
 Teuvo Kohonen, professor emeritus of computer science, neural networks pioneer
 Kaisa Nyberg, professor of computer science, cryptologist
 Raimo P. Hämäläinen, professor of applied mathematics and operations research
 Esa Saarinen, professor of applied philosophy
 Alvar Aalto (1898–1976), architect (M.Sc. 1921)
 Eliel Saarinen (1873–1950), architect, father of Eero Saarinen
 Jorma Rissanen, information theorist (D.Sc.)
 Risto Siilasmaa, founder and Chairman of F-Secure (M.Sc.)
 Jorma Ollila, Chairman of Royal Dutch Shell and Nokia, Restructurer of Nokia as CEO (M.Sc.)
 Matti Alahuhta, CEO of Kone (D.Sc.)
 Mårten Mickos, former CEO of MySQL (M.Sc.)
 Jyrki Kasvi, MP (D.Sc.)
 Satu Hassi, MEP, former MP and minister (Lic.Sc.)
 Antti Tuuri, writer, (M.Sc)
 Marjo Matikainen-Kallström, MP and olympic gold medalist, (M.Sc)
 Tuomas Sandholm, Professor at Carnegie Mellon University in the Computer Science Department
 Elin Törnudd (1924–2008), Finnish chief librarian and professor
 Pekka Lundmark, CEO of Nokia

Related links 
Aalto University

Notes and references

External links

 Helsinki University of Technology TKK at Aalto University website
 Helsinki University of Technology building map 
 Helsinki University of Technology at Google Maps
 The TKK's Study Programme ECTS Guide book

Helsinki University of Technology
Modernist architecture in Finland
Education in Espoo
Alvar Aalto buildings
Forestry education
Educational institutions established in 1849
Educational institutions disestablished in 2011
1849 establishments in the Russian Empire
1849 establishments in Finland
2011 disestablishments in Finland